Mannukku Mariyadhai is a 1995 Tamil language drama film directed by T. R. Vijayan. The film stars Vignesh and Sanghavi, with R. P. Viswam, Kavitha, Uday Prakash, Chinni Jayanth, newcomer Jayaprabhu, Vandhana and Mandai Seenu playing supporting roles. It was released on 22 September 1995.

Plot

Thupakki Gounder (R. P. Viswam) is a ruthless village chief and a greedy moneylender, every villager are afraid of him and his henchmen. Thupakki Gounder is married to Lakshmi (Kavitha), and they have a son (Uday Prakash) who is a womanizer and a daughter Bhavani (Sanghavi) who is studying in the city. He has also an illegitimate son Nagarajan (Jayaprabhu) who works as a blacksmith and Nagarajan wants his father to confess that he is his son in front of the villagers.

Pandian (Vignesh), an angry young man and a jobless graduate, is giving tuition to the uneducated villagers which annoy Thupakki Gounder. But beyond that, Pandian spends time with his jobless friends. Pandian lives with his father Samikannu (Samikannu) and his widow sister Kalyani (Vandhana). Her husband died after two days of marriage, nobody wants to marry her after this tragedy.

Bhavani arrives from the city, her father insisted to come in their village. He wants his daughter to provide lessons for the uneducated villagers. Her lessons become way more popular among the villagers than Pandian's lessons. After initial fights between Pandian and Bhavani, both fall in love. What transpires next forms the rest of the story.

Cast

Vignesh as Pandian
Sanghavi as Bhavani
R. P. Viswam as Thupakki Gounder
Kavitha as Lakshmi
Uday Prakash
Chinni Jayanth as Azhagu
Jayaprabhu as Nagarajan
Vandhana as Kalyani
Mandai Seenu as Mandai
Kumarimuthu
Loose Mohan
Idichapuli Selvaraj
Theni Kunjarammal
Pasi Narayanan
Samikannu as Samikannu
Kavithasri as Padmavati
Vennila as Rasathi
K. Kannan
Baba Bhaskar
Dharapuram Rajendran
Dharapuram V. S. Arumugam

Soundtrack

The film score and the soundtrack were composed by Devadevan. The soundtrack, released in 1995, features 6 tracks with lyrics written by Piraisoodan, Udhaya Bharathi, Aruvi Radha, Anbuthurai and Mohana Priyan.

References

1990s Tamil-language films
Indian drama films